Love in the 90z is a single by American recording artist Mack Wilds, released on November 24, 2015. The song was written by Elijah Blake, Salaam Remi and James Poyser, and produced by the latter two alongside new jack swing creator Teddy Riley and Scott Storch. With the music video premiering on January 16, 2016, The single was originally intended to be on Wilds's second studio album.

Music video
The music video was released on YouTube on January 16, 2016, and was directed by Benny Boom.

Background
The song makes multiple references to 1990s music, particularly contemporary R&B. These include TLC, Keith Sweat, Will Smith, R. Kelly and Jodeci.

References

2015 songs
Epic Records singles
Songs written by Teddy Riley
Songs written by Scott Storch
Songs written by Salaam Remi
Songs written by James Poyser
Songs written by Elijah Blake
Song recordings produced by Teddy Riley
Song recordings produced by Scott Storch
Song recordings produced by Salaam Remi
Music videos directed by Benny Boom